Roy William McKasson (August 23, 1939 – January 23, 1998) was an American football player.  

McKasson played for the Washington Huskies football team from 1959 to 1961.  He also played one year of professional football for the Edmonton Eskimos of the Canadian Football League. He was selected by the Associated Press (AP) as the second-team center on the 1959 All-Pacific Coast football team and as the first-team center on the 1960 All-Pacific Coast football team.  He was also selected by the AP, Newspaper Enterprise Association, and Football Writers Association of America as the first-team center on the 1960 College Football All-America Team. 

McKasson was inducted into the Washington Huskies Hall of Fame in 1987. He died in 1998 as the result of complications from a kidney transplant.

References

1939 births
1998 deaths
All-American college football players
American football centers
Edmonton Elks players
People from Kellogg, Idaho
Players of American football from Idaho
Washington Huskies football players